The Freedom 42 is an American sailboat, that was designed by Gary Mull and first built in 1987. The design is out of production.

Production
The boat was built by Tillotson Pearson in the United States for Freedom Yachts.

Design
The Freedom 42 is a small recreational keelboat, built predominantly of fiberglass, with wood trim. It has a free-standing fractional sloop rig, an internally-mounted spade-type rudder and a fixed fin keel. It displaces .

See also
List of sailing boat types

References

Keelboats
Sailboat type designs by Gary Mull
Sailboat types built by Pearson Yachts